The 1999 Tour du Haut Var was the 31st edition of the Tour du Haut Var cycle race and was held on 20 February 1999. The race started and finished in Draguignan. The race was won by Davide Rebellin.

General classification

References

1999
1999 in road cycling
1999 in French sport
February 1999 sports events in Europe